WCSS is an American radio station.

WCSS may also refer to:

 Welland Centennial Secondary School, a public high school in Welland, Ontario, Canada
 Westview Centennial Secondary School, a public high school in Toronto, Ontario, Canada 
 Within-cluster sum of squares, a metric in cluster analysis (used for example in the elbow method)
 World Congress of Soil Science, a conference held by the International Union of Soil Sciences
 World Congress on Social Simulation, a scientific conference series held by the European Social Simulation Association
 Wrocławskie Centrum Sieciowo-Superkomputerowe (Wrocław Center for Networking and Supercomputing), a part of the Wrocław University of Science and Technology providing environmental IT services for the Lower Silesia region